Miklós Holló (born 17 October 1943) is a Hungarian cross-country skier. He competed in the men's 15 kilometre event at the 1968 Winter Olympics.

References

External links
 

1943 births
Living people
Hungarian male cross-country skiers
Olympic cross-country skiers of Hungary
Cross-country skiers at the 1968 Winter Olympics
People from Jászberény
Sportspeople from Jász-Nagykun-Szolnok County
20th-century Hungarian people